The 1875 Maine gubernatorial election was held on September 13, 1875. Republican candidate Seldon Connor defeated the Democratic candidate Charles W. Roberts.

Candidates

Republican 
 Seldon Connor

Democratic 
 Charles W. Roberts

Results

References 

Maine gubernatorial elections
Maine
Gubernatorial